Philip Telford Georges, OCC, DAH was Chief Justice of Tanzania from 1965 to 1971, and several other appellate positions.

He  was born to John Henry Duport Georges and Milutine Cox and in Roseau, Dominica on January 5, 1923.

Education 

University of Toronto and Middle Temple, London.
Honorary Doctor of Laws (Toronto, Dar es Salaam, West Indies).

Career 

 Public defender, Trinidad Bar 1947
 Judge, Trinidad Bench 1962–1965
 Chief Justice, Supreme Court of Tanzania, 1965–1971
 Professor of Law, University of West Indies 1974–1981
 Judge, Supreme Court of Zimbabwe, 1981–1983
 Chief Justice, Supreme Court of Zimbabwe, 1983–1984
 Chief Justice, Supreme Court of the Bahamas, 1984–1989
 Judge, Court of Appeal, Cayman Islands since 1985
 Judge, Court of Appeal, Seychelles since 1987
 Judge, Court of Appeal, Bermuda since 1990

Death 

Justice Georges died on 13 January 2005. He was 82.

References

Further reading 

Dominica judges
1923 births
2005 deaths
Dominica expatriates in Canada
Dominica expatriates in the United Kingdom
Dominica expatriates in Tanzania
Recipients of the Order of the Caribbean Community
Dominica judges on the courts of Bermuda